Schweig is a surname. Notable people with the surname include:

 Aimee Schweig (1897–1987), American artist
 Eric Schweig (born 1967), Canadian actor
 Graham Schweig (born 1953), American author and scholar
 Shmuel Joseph Schweig (1905–1984),  Israeli photographer